This list of Colby College alumni includes graduates, non-graduate former students, current students, and honorary degree recipients of Colby College. Colby, which was founded in 1813, has a total of more than 25,000 living alumni.

Academia

Educators

Research and scholarship

Arts and entertainment

Athletics

Business and finance

Literature

Media

Politics and government

Members of the United States Congress

United States Federal and State Court Judges

United States Governors

Other political and legal figures

Others

See also 
 List of Colby College Faculty

References

Colby College alumni
List